The Funeral of Being is a second album by the American black metal band Xasthur released in 2003.

Track listing

2003 albums
Xasthur albums